95.6 BRFM is a community radio station serving the Isle of Sheppey in Kent which launched on 30 October 2006.

The station broadcasts 24 hours a day on 95.6 FM.

History
BRFM began broadcasting in 2004 as an online station serving Sheppey. After many Restricted Service Licences and trials, the station was granted a community licence by OFCOM in 2006, and began broadcasting later that year.

The licence was extended in 2011 by another five years.

Location
95.6 BRFM broadcasts from studios in Minster called "Windy Ridge" which is located on a cliff top in Oak Lane.  The transmitter is also located on the site.

See also
Sheppey FM 92.2

References

External links
 BRFM

Radio stations in Kent
Radio stations established in 2006
Community radio stations in the United Kingdom
Borough of Swale